Euspondylus acutirostris,  the sharp-snouted sun tegus, is a species of lizard in the family Gymnophthalmidae. It is endemic to Venezuela.

References

Euspondylus
Reptiles of Venezuela
Endemic fauna of Venezuela
Reptiles described in 1863
Taxa named by Wilhelm Peters